Nicole Herschmann (born 27 October 1975 in Rudolstadt, East Germany) is a German former triple jumper and bobsledder. Competing in two Winter Olympics, she won a bronze medal in the two-woman event at Salt Lake City in 2002.

Herschmann also won a bronze in the two-woman event at the 2008 FIBT World Championships in Altenberg, Germany.

References
 Bobsleigh two-woman Olympic medalists since 2002
 DatabaseOlympics.com profile
 FIBT profile
 

1975 births
Living people
People from Rudolstadt
People from Bezirk Gera
German female bobsledders
German female long jumpers
German female triple jumpers
Sportspeople from Thuringia
Olympic bobsledders of Germany
Bobsledders at the 2002 Winter Olympics
Bobsledders at the 2006 Winter Olympics
Olympic bronze medalists for Germany
Olympic medalists in bobsleigh
Medalists at the 2002 Winter Olympics
Recipients of the Silver Laurel Leaf
21st-century German women